Me? is the debut extended play by South Korean singer Park Ye-eun under her stage name "Ha:tfelt" (핫펠트 "heartfelt"), released on July 31, 2014 by JYP Entertainment. The lead single, "Ain't Nobody", was used to promote the album. The album was included in Billboard'''s list of the 10 best K-pop albums of 2014.

History
Ha:tfelt held her debut stage performance on July 31, 2014 on Mnet's M Countdown. The song was also performed on Music Bank, Show! Music Core and Inkigayo.

Reception
Jeff Benjamin, writing for Billboard'', was very positive about the album, praising the singer for her vocals (which he compared to Sia's) and for "singing, co-composing and co-writing" the entire album, "taking risks with her music and image".

Track listing

Charts

Album charts

Sales

Single charts

Release history

References

2014 debut EPs
JYP Entertainment EPs
Genie Music EPs
Korean-language EPs